Finocchio refers to Florence fennel. Finocchio can also be a negative term for homosexual in Italian.

Other 
Finocchio may also refer to:

Finocchio (Rome Metro), a station of Line C of the Rome Metro
Finocchio's Club, a former nightclub and bar in San Francisco

See also
Finocchiaro
Finocchiona
Finocchito